Real Rebola  is an Equatoguinean football club based in the city of Rebola in  Bioko Norte Province. The club played many season in  Equatoguinean Premier League.

In 1979 the team has won Equatoguinean Premier League.

Currently the team plays in Equatoguinean Second Division.

Achievements
Equatoguinean Premier League: 1
1979

References

External links
Foot-base

Football clubs in Equatorial Guinea